Exit fee may refer to:

Exit taxation
Fees paid for early withdrawal from a contract: see Pricing#Exit fees
Fees paid on withdrawal from an investment fund: see Investment fund#Fee types